Wilbert Marcelo Rosalyn (born June 17, 1997), known professionally as Wilbert Ross, is a Filipino actor, singer and dancer. He is known as a member of Hashtags, a male-group dance performer on the noontime variety show It's Showtime on ABS-CBN.

Career

2016: Tawag ng Tanghalan

In February 2016, Wilbert joined the Philippine singing competition Tawag ng Tanghalan currently airing as a segment of the noontime program, It's Showtime on ABS-CBN. He performed "Hello" by Lionel Richie though he was eliminated during the daily round.

2016: Pinoy Boyband Superstar
In September 2016, he auditioned at ABS-CBN's competition on search for the newest boyband in the Philippines Pinoy Boyband Superstar where he got 95% of the votes from the all-girl audience on the first round. 
Wilbert performed the "Can’t Take My Eyes Off Of You". He made it at the Top 20 but did not make it at the Top 12 stage.

2017–2020: Hashtags
In 2017, Wilbert was introduced as a new member of the dance group Hashtags that performs regularly on the ABS-CBN noontime show “It’s Showtime".

Discography

Filmography

Television

Webcast

Film

Music Video

Concerts

Awards and nominations

References

External links 
 

Filipino male dancers
1997 births
Living people
21st-century Filipino male singers
People from Davao del Sur
ABS-CBN personalities
Viva Artists Agency